The 2012–13 Iraq Division One season began on December 8, 2012. Sulaymaniya were the champions of the previous season and Naft Al-Junoob were runners-up, hence both promoted to the 2012–13 Iraqi Premier League.

Format and teams

The 42 teams were split into six groups. At the end of the regular season, the top 2 teams from each group, a total of 12 teams advanced to the next round. In the second round, these 12 teams will be split into two groups of 6, with teams playing a home and away round robin matches with each opponent in the group. The top two teams in each of the two groups advanced to the next round creating a 4 team playoff. The Final stage is one group with teams playing a home and away round robin matches with each opponent in the group. The top two teams qualify to the 2013–14 Iraqi Premier League next season.

Groups stage

Group 1

Group 2

Final stage
The Final stage is one group with teams playing a home and away round robin matches with each opponent in the group. The top two teams qualify to the 2013–14 Iraqi Premier League next season.

See also
 2012–13 Iraqi Premier League
 2012–13 Iraq FA Cup

References

External links
 Iraq Football Association

Iraq Division One seasons
2012–13 in Iraqi football
Iraq